KZKS (105.3 FM) is a radio station which broadcasts a classic rock format. Licensed to Rifle, Colorado, United States, it serves the Grand Junction area.  The station is currently owned by Western Slope Communications. The station is an affiliate of the Floydian Slip syndicated Pink Floyd program.

External links

ZKS
Classic rock radio stations in the United States
Radio stations established in 1971